Binnya Dala or Banya Dala was a court title used at the courts of Hanthawaddy Kingdom, Toungoo Dynasty and Restored Hanthawaddy Kingdom.

 Viceroy Binnya Kyan of Martaban: Binnya Dala was his title when he was governor of Dala (1414–1422)
 Binnya Dala (Hanthawaddy general):  General of Hanthawaddy defeated in the Battle of Naungyo in 1538
 Binnya Dala (minister-general):  Chief Minister and general of Toungoo (1559–1573)
 Viceroy Binnya Dala of Martaban (1600–1610s?); Siamese vassal (1600–1605)
 King Binnya Dala of Restored Hanthawaddy (r. 1747–1757)